Giannis Kolokas (Greek: Γιάννης Κολόκας; born June 28, 1985  Pyrgos, Elis, Greece) is a Greek footballer who currently plays for Gamma Ethniki club Paniliakos, as a centre back .

References

External links
 
Myplayer.gr Profile
Onsports Profile

1985 births
Living people
Greek footballers
Association football central defenders
Paniliakos F.C. players
Ethnikos Asteras F.C. players
Ergotelis F.C. players
Panegialios F.C. players
Panelefsiniakos F.C. players
Footballers from Pyrgos, Elis